Skills Challenge may refer to

the annual NBA All-Star Weekend Skills Challenge
the Our Skills Challenge Award, one of the UK's Cub Scouts' challenge awards